His Best Friend  is a 1937 German crime film directed by and starring Harry Piel. It also features Edna Greyff, Henry Lorenzen and Lissy Arna. It was shot at the Johannisthal Studios in Berlin. The film's sets were designed by the art directors Karl Weber and Erich Zander. Piel had previously starred in a 1929 film of the same title.

Plot 
It's already dark outside and the rain is falling in torrents. A German Shepherd appears to be wandering aimlessly down the sidewalk when he bumps into detective Harry Peters. Peters first takes the seemingly abandoned dog with him and the next day goes in search of the owner. He is a dog dealer from whom he quickly buys the shepherd dog despite tight funds. Harry thinks the animal he calls Griffin is very alert and decides to train him to be a police dog. Master and dog soon become an unbeatable team when it comes to catching and arresting bad guys. Since dogs often turn out to be relationship starters, one day Harry meets young Gerda Lind on a walk thanks to Greif. She works as a dancer and Harry quickly falls in love with her. Harry promises to visit Gerda at her next dance performance, but something comes up: the house of a Mr. Müller has been raided and Harry is called to action with the trusty griffin.

While Harry stays behind, Griffin picks up the trail and sprints off. He quickly confronts the crooks. But Greif reacts completely differently than expected, because the man standing in front of him is called Emil Kruppack and is Greif's former owner, whose German shepherd was still called Rolf. The animal happily greets its former owner. Sergeant Schütz meanwhile ran after Rolf/Greif and is now being attacked by the police dog after Kruppack had chased Rolf on the policeman. He is completely perplexed and tries to defend himself against the animal attack. Kruppack shoots at Schütz and finally takes to his heels, with the police dog Greif at his side. The police arrest Kruppack's brother Max. Harry finds Schütz seriously injured and has him shipped to the hospital. Peters visits him there and has his colleague tell him about the course of events. Deeply shocked, Harry learns that Greif apparently went along with the criminal without hesitation. Harry now knows that if Griffin is ever found again in the future, he can no longer rely on him.

In the meantime, Emil Kruppack has commissioned a young man named Paul Werner, who is called an “eightpenny boy” (snitch, rent boy) in appropriate circles, to do his dirty work and kill Griffin, since the dog’s behavior would sooner or later kill him later betrayed to the police. When Werner wants to do the bloody job, Greif escapes and returns to Harry Peters. Both reunion joy is huge. In the meantime, several connections have been uncovered that must have led Harry to believe that Gerda could be in cahoots with Kruppack. Both reunions are correspondingly cool when Harry summons Gerda to police headquarters for interrogation. In fact, Gerda and Kruppack know each other, because the young woman had once reported the fugitive crook, who then swore revenge on her.

It a new track. Emmi Gärtner, the bride of the robbed Mr. Müller, admits that Müller is actually Kruppack's fence and is said to have robbed the burglar of his wages. Fearing for her lover, she reveals anything that could lead to Kruppack's arrest. In fact, Müller is supposed to meet Kruppack, and Harry Peters wants to join his colleagues. He doesn't want to take Greif with him because he doubts his reliability, especially since the old owner Kruppack Greif, who was then present, could again plunge him into a conflict of loyalty. But Griffin turns out to be Harry's eponymous best friend and secretly follows him. When Müller sees the police, he immediately wants to storm, but runs straight into Peters' arms. When he wants to show Harry the loot, Kruppack comes up and threatens Harry with a gun. A fight ensues and a shot is fired. The griffon dog throws himself into the fray for Harry and is badly injured by the fired bullet, Kruppack arrested. Griffin drags himself into a side room where Harry finds his best friend dead. Gerda and he become a couple.

Cast

References

Bibliography

External links 
 

1937 films
Films of Nazi Germany
German crime films
1937 crime films
1930s German-language films
Films directed by Harry Piel
German black-and-white films
Films shot at Johannisthal Studios
Tobis Film films
Films shot in Berlin

1930s German films